Vladimir Dyomin (10 March 1921 – 10 October 1966) was a Russian football player and coach.

Career 
Dyomin was born in Aleskino, Ryazan Governorate, Russian SFSR. He started playing as a striker in 1935 in a children's team in Moscow, then in 1937–1938 in the junior team Spartak Moscow. In 1939, he made his debut in the starting line of the senior team of Spartak Moscow. In 1944, he moved to CDKA Moscow and from 1947 he served as team captain. In September 1952, he joined the  Kalinin city team. In 1954, he finished his playing career in the reborn CDSA Moscow.

On 27 May 1952, he made his debut in the Soviet Union team in an unofficial match against Hungary (2–1). After retiring he became a football coach, and in the years 1955–1957 and from June 1958 to October 1966, he worked the CSKA Moscow football academy. From January to May 1958, he led ODO Lviv. 
He was champion of the USSR in 1939, 1946, 1947, 1948, 1950, 1951 and winner of the USSR Cup in 1945, 1948 and 1951.

He became ill with tuberculosis and was treated in a clinic near Moscow. But ignoring the recommendations of doctors, he died on 10 October 1966 in Moscow.

References 

1921 births
1966 deaths
People from Ryazhsky Uyezd
SKA Lviv managers
Soviet Top League players
FC Spartak Moscow players
PFC CSKA Moscow players
Russian football managers
Russian footballers
Soviet football managers
Soviet footballers
Association football forwards
20th-century deaths from tuberculosis
Tuberculosis deaths in the Soviet Union
Tuberculosis deaths in Russia